The Federal Kuala Lumpur is an international-class hotel located in Bukit Bintang, Kuala Lumpur, Malaysia. It hosts post-independence Malaya's first revolving restaurant.

History
The Federal Kuala Lumpur is the first international-class hotel of post-independence Malaya. It was built to coincide with Malaya's Independence commemoration to serve as a hotel for witnessing foreign dignitaries. It opened  for business just three days before Malaya's Independence Day which falls on 31 August 1957. It was founded by Low Yat (father of Low Yow Chuan). The architect of the original nine-story building was Lee Yoon Thim. The taller wing housing the revolving restaurant was built in the early 1960s.

See also
Shangri-La Kuala Lumpur
Ritz-Carlton Kuala Lumpur
JW Marriott Kuala Lumpur
Bukit Bintang - Kuala Lumpur's designated retail district

References

External links

The Federal Kuala Lumpur official Site

Buildings and structures with revolving restaurants
1957 establishments in Malaya
Hotel buildings completed in 1957
Modernist architecture in Malaysia
Skyscraper hotels in Kuala Lumpur